Doris J. Kelley is a former Iowa State Representative from the 20th District. She served in the Iowa House of Representatives from 2007 to 2011.

Kelley served on several committees in the Iowa House – the Commerce committee; the Education committee; the Local Government committee; and the Ways and Means committee.  She also served as vice-chair of the Administration and Regulation Appropriations Subcommittee.

Kelley was elected in 2006 with 6,344 votes (52%), defeating Republican opponent David Wieland. 

In the November 2, 2010 general election, Kelley was defeated by Republican challenger Walt Rogers.

External links
 Representative Doris Kelley official Iowa General Assembly site
 Doris Kelley State Representative official constituency site
 
 

Democratic Party members of the Iowa House of Representatives
Living people
Women state legislators in Iowa
Year of birth missing (living people)
Place of birth missing (living people)
21st-century American women